Mazaa Mazaa is a 2005 Hindi comedy-drama film.

Cast 
 Payal Rohatgi
 Farid Amiri
 Vishwajeet Pradhan
 Pankaj Berry
 Tej Sapru

Music
Mazaa Mazaa - Shreya Ghoshal
Akhh - Mohini Singh
Akhh (Remix) - Arun Daga, Sonu Kakkar
Dance Dance (aaye Jawanee Aaye) - Sunidhi Chauhan, Arun Daga
Dil Hain Darwesho Kee Mehandee - Sonu Kakkar, Arun Daga
Dil Me Kyon Aaise - Arun Daga, Shreya Ghoshal

References

External links 
 

2005 films
2000s Hindi-language films